Karyer Izvestnyak is a rural locality (a settlement) in Vsevolodo-Vilvenskoye Urban Settlement, Alexandrovsky District, Perm Krai, Russia. The population was 1,752 as of 2010. There are 24 streets.

Geography 
Karyer Izvestnyak is located 9 km northwest of Alexandrovsk (the district's administrative centre) by road. Vsevolodo-Vilva is the nearest rural locality.

References 

Rural localities in Alexandrovsky District